Paralogistis is a genus of moth in the family Scythrididae.

Species
 Paralogistis litholeuca Meyrick, 1921
 Paralogistis ochrura Meyrick, 1913
 Paralogistis raesaeneni Bengtsson, 2014
 Paralogistis symmocidoides Bengtsson, 2014
 Paralogistis willyi Bengtsson, 2014

References

Scythrididae